Albert Alcalay (August 17, 1917 Paris - March 29, 2008 Boston) was an American abstract artist, also known as an abstract expressionism artist.

Life
Albert Alcalay was born in Paris in 1917, a son of Samuel and Lepa Alcalay, both of whom were born in Serbia. On the eve of the outbreak of World War I, his banker father had been moved from Belgrade to Paris, and when the war ended, the family returned to Belgrade.  There, whilst attending secondary school, young Albert was apprenticed to an artist.  At that time, he began studying architecture.  When World War II started, he joined the Yugoslavian army.

It was not long before Yugoslavia surrendered and he became a prisoner of war where he was imprisoned in the Ferramonti internment camp.
Upon regaining freedom he settled in Rome, where he began painting. In 1951, he and his wife Vera, moved to the United States.
He had his first individual show at the Swetzoff Gallery in 1952.  
In 1959, he was a Guggenheim Fellow.
He taught at Harvard University, from 1960 to 1982.
Alcalay’s work is in the permanent collections of the Museum of Modern Art in New York, the Fogg Art Museum in Cambridge, the Museum of Modern Art in Rome, Colby College, Simmons College, Smith College and the University of Massachusetts, among others.  
He lived on Martha's Vineyard.

The story of Alcalay’s escape from German Nazis and Italian Fascists, his development as a painter, his immigration to the United States where he became one of the founders of Harvard’s Department of Visual and Environmental Studies (VES), and his struggle to remain creative despite severe health problems, is told in a new film, "Albert Alcalay: Self Portraits," premiering Jan. 22 [2004] at the Harvard Film Archive. The film can be viewed on Vimeo.

Exhibitions
 2008 "Albert Alcalay: Self Portraits", Fort Worth Modern 
 2009 Remembering Albert Alcalay, Carpenter Center for the Visual Arts

References

External links
 "Oral history interview with Albert Alcalay, 1979 Jan. 17-Oct. 19", Archives of American Art
 http://aptonline.org/catalog.nsf/vLinkTitle/ALBERT+ALCALAY+SELF+PORTRAITS
 http://news.harvard.edu/gazette/2004/01.15/09-alcalay.html
 http://www.artnet.com/artists/albert-alcalay/past-auction-results
 http://www.invaluable.com/auction-lot/albert-s.-alcalay-american,-b.-1917-stone-forma-627-c-cb5507c32d

1917 births
2008 deaths
Artists from Paris
Harvard University faculty
Painters from Massachusetts
20th-century American painters
American male painters
American people of Serbian-Jewish descent
20th-century French Sephardi Jews
French emigrants to Yugoslavia
Yugoslav expatriates in Italy
Yugoslav emigrants to the United States
20th-century American male artists